The Security Council of the Russian Federation (SCRF or Sovbez) is a constitutional consultative body of the Russian president that supports the president's decision-making on national security affairs and matters of strategic interest. Composed of Russia's top state officials and heads of defence and security agencies and chaired by the president of Russia, the SCRF acts as a forum for coordinating and integrating national security policy.

History, status, and role

The Security Council of the RSFSR was legally set up by Congress of People's Deputies of Russia    in April 1991 along with the post of the President of the RSFSR (the RSFSR at that time operated as one of the constituent republics of the USSR). The 1993 Constitution of Russia refers to the SCRF in Article 83, which stipulates (as one of the president's prerogatives) that the SCRF is formed and headed by the president of Russia, also saying that the status of the SCRF is to be defined by a federal law.

The 2010 Law on Security defines the legal status of the SCRF as a "constitutional consultative body" concerned with elaboration of decisions by the president in the fields of Russia's defence and national security. The SCRF comprises its chairman (the president of Russia), the Secretary of the SCRF, its full members, and members, as appointed by the president. Under the law, the Secretary of the SCRF is appointed by the president and reports directly to him.

Decisions of the SCRF are adopted by its full members and approved by the president, who may issue decrees or orders for the purpose of implementing them.

The Presidential Decree of 6 May 2011 enacted the Statute of the SCRF as well as a host of other statutes pertaining to the structure and composition of the SCRF.

It has been argued that the coordinating role defined for the Security Council in the National Security Strategy to 2020, published in May 2009, represents a strengthening of the council's influence and importance within Russian governance under its new Secretary Nikolai Patrushev.

On 16 January 2020, president Vladimir Putin signed a decree that amended the relevant laws and established a new state office of Deputy Chairman of the Security Council. On the same day, president Putin appointed Dmitry Medvedev as Deputy Chairman of the Security Council.

Composition
As of 30 May 2022:

Permanent members

Non-permanent members

Deputy Chairmen of the Security Council
 Dmitry Medvedev (since 16 January 2020)

Secretaries of the Security Council
 Yury Skokov (3 April 1992 – 10 May 1993)
 Yevgeny Shaposhnikov (11 June 1993 – 18 September 1993)
 Oleg Lobov (18 September 1993 – 18 June 1996)
 Aleksandr Lebed (18 June 1996 – 17 October 1996)
 Ivan Rybkin (19 October 1996 – 2 March 1998)
 Andrei Kokoshin (3 March 1998 – 10 September 1998)
 Nikolai Bordyuzha (14 September 1998 – 19 March 1999)
 Vladimir Putin (29 March 1999 – 9 August 1999)
 Sergei Ivanov (15 November 1999 – 28 March 2001)
 Vladimir Rushailo (28 March 2001 – 9 March 2004)
 Igor Ivanov (9 March 2004 – 17 June 2007)
 Valentin Sobolev (acting) (17 June 2007 – 12 May 2008)
 Nikolai Patrushev (since 12 May 2008)

First Deputy Secretaries of the Security Council
 Mikhail Mityukov (7 December 1996 – 24 April 1998)
 Vyacheslav Mikhailov (8 June 1998 – 25 May 1999)
 Vladislav Sherstyuk (31 May 1999 – ? March 2004)
 Mikhail Fradkov (31 May 2000 – 28 March 2001)
 Nikolai Solovyov (24 June 2002 – ? March 2004)
 Vladimir Bulavin (30 May 2008 – 11 March 2013)
 Yury Averyanov (since 29 March 2013)

Deputy Secretaries of the Security Council
 Vladislav Nasinovsky (23 December 1992 – 30 August 1993)
 Yury Nazarkin (11 January 1993 – 30 August 1993)
 Vladimir Rubanov (9 August 1993 – 25 June 1996)
 Aleksandr Troshin (26 October 1993 – 25 June 1996)
 Valery Manilov (27 October 1993 – 18 September 1996)
 Vladimir Denisov (25 June 1996 – 29 October 1996)
 Sergei Kharlamov (25 June 1996 – 29 October 1996)
 Nikolai Mikhailov (31 June 1996 – 11 September 1997)
 Boris Berezovsky (29 October 1996 – 4 November 1997)
 Leonid Mayorov (29 October 1996 – 30 May 1998)
 Yury Deryabin (5 December 1996 – 30 March 1998)
 Boris Agapov (9 June 1997 – 8 June 1998)
 Aleksandr Ageyenkov (17 October 1997 – 8 August 1998)
 Vladimir Potapov (21 August 1998 – ? ? 2004)
 Grigory Rapota (21 August 1998 – 27 November 1998)
 Aleksei Molyakov (30 May 1998 – ? ? 1999)
 Aleksei Moskovsky (8 June 1998 – 28 March 2001)
 Viktor Melnikov (8 August 1998 – 16 September 1998)
 Oleg Chernov (4 January 1999 – ? ? 2004)
 Aleksei Ogaryov (2 February 1999 – 2 August 1999)
 Vladimir Vasilyev (31 May 1999 – 28 March 2001)
 Valentin Sobolev (31 May 2000 – 23 March 2012)
 Vyacheslav Soltaganov (28 March 2001 – ? ? 2004)
 Nikolai Solovyov (19 May 2001 – 24 June 2002)
 Valentin Stepankov (5 August 2003 – 1 June 2004)
 Yevgeny Nazdratenko (30 August 2003 – ? ? 2004)
 Yury Zubakov (28 May 2004 – 3 June 2011)
 Nikolai Spassky (28 May 2004 – 24 June 2006)
 Vladimir Nazarov (9 August 2006 – 17 October 2016)
 Yury Baluyevsky (3 June 2008 – 9 January 2012)
 Nikolai Klimashin (3 June 2011 – 3 December 2013)
 Yury Averyanov (20 January 2012 – 29 March 2013)
 Yevgeny Lukyanov (23 March 2012 – 15 December 2016)
 Sergei Buravlyov (14 December 2013 – ? ? 2017)
 Rashid Nurgaliyev (since 22 May 2012)
 Mikhail Popov (since 29 March 2013)
 Sergei Vakhrukov (since 31 October 2016)
 Aleksandr Grebenkin (since 23 December 2016)
 Oleg Khramov (since 17 January 2017)
 Yury Kokov (since 26 September 2018)
 Aleksandr Venediktov (since 21 February 2019)

Assistants to the Secretary of the Security Council
 Anatoly Krivolapov (2 August 2004 – 10 December 2008)
 Vladislav Sherstyuk (16 September 2004 – 24 December 2010)
 Vladimir Nazarov (25 January 2005 – 9 August 2006)
 Yury Averyanov (17 May 2006 – 20 January 2012)
 Vladimir Zavershinsky (11 June 2008 – 21 October 2013)
 Nikolai Klimashin (29 October 2010 – 3 June 2011)
 Yevgeny Lukyanov (24 December 2010 – 23 March 2012)
 Mikhail Popov (20 January 2012 – 29 March 2013)
 Aleksandr Grebenkin (25 May 2012 – 23 December 2016)
 Ilya Shinkaryov (15 November 2013 – 25 February 2016)
 Sergei Vakhrukov (6 December 2013 – 31 October 2016)
 Aleksandr Venediktov (23 December 2016 – 21 February 2019)
 Aleksandr Abelin (1 December 2016 – 1 January 2022)
 Aleksei Pavlov (19 March 2009 – 7 May 2012, 25 May 2012 – 20 January 2023)
 Nail Mukhitov (since 2 April 2016)

Assistants to the Deputy Chairman of the Security Council
 Oleg Osipov (since 13 February 2020)
 Sergei Sobolev (since 13 February 2020)
 Mikhail Trinoga (since 13 February 2020)
 Dmitry Tsvetkov (since 7 July 2020)
 Aleksei Zaklyazminsky (since 18 January 2021)

Managers of the Secretariat of the Deputy Chairman of the Security Council
 Sergei Chebotaryov (since 11 March 2020)

See also
Council of Ministers of Russia
Government of Russia
Security Council of the Soviet Union

References

External links
 
  
 Agentura.ru  
 Information in English

Government of Russia
Russia
1992 establishments in Russia